Harold Kosoff (November 5, 1930 – March 12, 1995) was an inventor. He is credited with inventing the free piston engine and the battery-powered baby swing. U.S. Pat. No. 4,448,410 Exclusive rights for the battery-powered baby swing were sold to Graco. In addition, Kosoff invented a home air cleaner and chainless bicycle using an arc and pulley system.

References

External links
https://www.nytimes.com/1964/04/11/archives/freepiston-engine-is-patented-invention-developed-in-garage-needs.html
United States Patent 4448410, US Patent Office. Accessed 2007-01-04.
, Canadian Patent Office Issued May 25, 1965
, New York Times Article, April 11, 1964

References 

1930 births
1995 deaths
20th-century American engineers
American inventors

gbggb